George Nunatak is a nunatak,  high, located midway between the eastern part of the Harold Byrd Mountains and Leverett Glacier in Antarctica. It was named by the Advisory Committee on Antarctic Names for Paul George, a member of the U.S. Army helicopter unit which supported the United States Geological Survey Topo West and Topo East surveys of 1962–63.

References

Nunataks of Marie Byrd Land